Hudson Avenue (formerly known as Highwood) is a former railroad station between Hudson Avenue and Ivy Lane in Englewood, New Jersey. It was once served by the Erie Railroad's Northern Branch. By 1910 the station also served as the Highwood neighborhood of Englewood’s post office. The station is no longer standing. 

It was preceded by the Tenafly station (towards Nyack), and followed by the Englewood station (towards Jersey City).

References

Former Erie Railroad stations
Englewood, New Jersey
1859 establishments in New Jersey
Railway stations closed in 1966
Railway stations in the United States opened in 1859
Former railway stations in New Jersey
1966 disestablishments in New Jersey